Chinguar is a town and municipality in Bié Province in Angola. The municipality had a population of 129,370 in 2014.

Chinguar Municipality is divided into three communes, Chinguar, Kangote and Kutato.

Transport 
Chinguar lies on the central (Benguela) railway of Angola.

See also 

 Railway stations in Angola

References

Populated places in Bié Province
Municipalities of Angola